Bread, Love and Dreams is a 1953 Italian romantic comedy film directed by Luigi Comencini. At the 4th Berlin International Film Festival it won the Silver Bear award.

Plot
The film is set in Sagliena, an imaginary small town in central Italy; Marshal Antonio Carotenuto, an elderly womanizer who will have to adapt to the monotonous and quiet life of the village, is transferred here immediately after the war. Supported by the maid Caramella, the marshal runs the local police station. Here he meets "Pizzicarella la Bersagliera", a young local girl secretly in love with the carabiniere Stelluti. At first the marshal tries to get engaged to the "Bersagliera", as Paoletta, the sacristan of the parish, is in love with the carabiniere Stelluti, but the latter is actually in love with the Bersagliera and wants her mother to know her.  So, thanks to the intervention of Don Emidio, who informs the marshal, Stelluti and the Bersagliera get engaged while the marshal, on the evening of the feast of Sant'Antonio, gets engaged to the town's midwife: Annarella.

Cast
 Vittorio De Sica as Antonio Carotenuto
 Gina Lollobrigida as Maria De Ritis
 Marisa Merlini as Annarella Mirziano
 Virgilio Riento as Don Emidio
 Tina Pica as Caramella
 Maria-Pia Casilio as Paoletta
 Roberto Risso as Pietro Stelluti
 Memmo Carotenuto as Sirio Baiocchi
 Vittoria Crispo as Maria Antonia De Ritis
 Guglielmo Barnabò as Don Concezio

Reception
Pane, amore e fantasia is usually considered the most famous example of Pink neorealism.

The film contains what many critics regard as Gina Lollobrigida's best and most naturalistic performance. The film's popularity resulted in two sequels, one with Lollobrigida: Pane, amore e gelosia (US title: Frisky) and the open-ended Pane, amore e... (English title: Scandal in Sorrento) starring Sophia Loren in the female lead role. De Sica also reprised his role in the Spanish-set Bread, Love and Andalusia (1958).

In popular culture
In The Andy Griffith Show, Season 5, Episode 17, Barney Fife sends a letter saying he watched this movie while on vacation in Raleigh, NC. However, he calls the movie “Bread, Love and Beans” in his letter to Andy.

References

External links 

1953 films
Italian black-and-white films
1950s Italian-language films
1953 romantic comedy films
Titanus films
Films directed by Luigi Comencini
Films scored by Alessandro Cicognini
Italian romantic comedy films
1950s Italian films